Jamaica is scheduled to compete at the 2023 Pan American Games in Santiago, Chile from October 20 to November 5, 2023. This will be Jamaica's 19th appearance at the Pan American Games, having competed at every edition of the Games.

Competitors
The following is the list of number of competitors (per gender) participating at the games per sport/discipline.

Football

Women's tournament

Jamaica qualified a women's team of 18 athletes after finishing as the top ranked Caribbean team at the 2022 CONCACAF W Championship.
Summary

Rugby sevens

Men's tournament

Jamaica qualified a men's team (of 12 athletes) by reaching the final of the 2022 RAN Super Sevens.

Summary

Women's tournament

Jamaica qualified a women's team (of 12 athletes) by reaching the final of the 2022 RAN Women's Super Sevens

Summary

References

Nations at the 2023 Pan American Games
2023